Duško Petrov (born 13 May 1988) is a Serbian sport shooter. As junior, Petrov was great talent with air pistol. Later, with his team (Damir Mikec and Dimitrije Grgic) won gold medal on european championship in Gabala (Azerbaijan) 2017. Petrov is also one of the best shooter in German Bundesliga and owner of Serbian national record with Free pistol 50m.

He participated at the 2018 ISSF World Shooting Championships.

References

External links

Living people
1988 births
Serbian male sport shooters
ISSF pistol shooters